Xavier Alshon McKinney  (born August 9, 1999) is an American football safety for the New York Giants of the National Football League (NFL). He played college football at Alabama.

Early years
McKinney attended Roswell High School in Roswell, Georgia. As a senior, he recorded 82 tackles and seven interceptions. He committed to the University of Alabama to play college football.

College career
As a true freshman at Alabama in 2017, McKinney played in 13 games as a backup and special teams player. As a starter in 2018, he had 73 tackles, two interceptions and three sacks. He was named the defensive MVP of the 2018 Orange Bowl. On January 4, 2020, McKinney announced he would skip his senior season and would enter the 2020 NFL Draft.

Professional career

New York Giants

2020
McKinney was drafted by the New York Giants in the second round with the 36th overall pick in the 2020 NFL Draft. On September 6, 2020, McKinney was placed on injured reserve with a fractured foot. He was activated on November 28, 2020. On January 3, 2021, against the Dallas Cowboys, McKinney recorded his first career interception off quarterback Andy Dalton in the end zone with 1:24 remaining in the 4th quarter helping the Giants beat the Cowboys 23–19.

2021
On week 6 against the Los Angeles Rams McKinney intercepted 2 passes, one pass thrown by Matthew Stafford intended for Cooper Kupp and the other pass thrown by John Wolford also intended for Kupp. On November 3, 2021, the New York Giants announced that McKinney was in the COVID protocol. In Week 9 against the Las Vegas Raiders, McKinney recorded seven tackles and intercepted two passes from Derek Carr, returning one for a touchdown, helping the Giants beat the Raiders, 23-16. He was named NFC Defensive player of the Week as a result for his performance.

2022
During the Giants Week 9 bye week, McKinney suffered a broken hand in an ATV accident, which will sideline him for multiple weeks. He was placed on Reserve/Non-Football Injury. He was activated on December 31.

References

External links
New York Giants bio
Alabama Crimson Tide bio

1999 births
Living people
African-American players of American football
Alabama Crimson Tide football players
American football safeties
New York Giants players
People from Roswell, Georgia
Players of American football from Georgia (U.S. state)
Sportspeople from Fulton County, Georgia
21st-century African-American sportspeople